Wilson Fittipaldi Júnior (born 25 December 1943) is a Brazilian former racing driver and Formula One team owner. He participated in 38 World Championship Formula One Grands Prix, debuting on May 1, 1972, scoring a total of three championship points. He ran the Fittipaldi Formula One team between 1974 and 1982. He also participated in numerous non-Championship Formula One races.

Family
Born on Christmas day 1943, Wilson Fittipaldi Jr is the elder son of prominent motorsports journalist and radio commentator Wilson Sr and his wife Juzy, who had both raced production cars shortly after the Second World War. Wilson Sr was also responsible for the first Mil Milhas race in 1956, in São Paulo, having been inspired by the 1949 Italian Mille Miglia. Wilson Jr is often referred to as 'Wilsinho' ("Little Wilson", cf. Rubens Barrichello's occasional nickname of Rubinho or footballer Ronaldinho) or 'Tigrão'. He unsurprisingly became a keen motorsports enthusiast from an early age.

Wilson Fittipaldi is the older brother of CART champion and double Formula One world champion Emerson Fittipaldi. Like Jimmy Stewart and Ian Scheckter he remained in the shadow of his younger and more illustrious sibling in top level motorsport. He married Suzy. He is the father of former CART, Formula One and NASCAR driver Christian Fittipaldi and has a daughter, Roberta.

Racing career

Wilson Fittipaldi started racing the karts that he and his brother built in Brazil in the 1960s, before moving on to Formula Vee.

He made a brief trip to Europe in 1966 to race in Formula Three, but the opportunity fell through due to conflicts with the team he drove for in Brazil. He did not return to England until 1970, following his brother's success in Formula Two. That year he raced a Jim Russell Driving School entered Lotus 59 in British Formula Three, beating Carlos Pace and works Lotus driver Dave Walker, among others, to a victory at a BARC Championship round at Silverstone. At various times during the year he was also competing with future Formula One champions Niki Lauda and James Hunt. Combined with some other good results, particularly in the latter part of the year, including wins in two non-championship rounds, this enabled him to move up to the European Formula Two championship for 1971.

Here he scored several more good results racing alongside his brother for Team Bardahl-Fittipaldi in Lotus and March chassis including a podium in Hockenheim and 4th places at Rouen and Mantorp Park. These results were sufficient to gain him a deal with the Brabham Formula One team for the 1972 season as a pay driver.

His Formula One career started with a podium at the 1972 Brazilian Grand Prix - however, this was a non-championship race and he would not be able to repeat the performance in the world championship. He was a moderately competitive midfield runner for Brabham in 1972 and 1973. He scored no points in the 1972 championship. In 1973 he scored his only Formula One World Championship points with a sixth place in Buenos Aires and a fifth place in Nürburgring. His best qualifying results were 9th in Monaco and 10th at Mosport also in 1973.

Wilson, tired of both being a paying driver and being a second driver on the team, without being able to challenge the team's first driver Carlos Reutemann under the boss's orders Bernie Ecclestone, took a break from driving at the beginning of 1974 to set up a Brazilian Formula One team (although have disputed the non-championship Formula One race Grande Premio Presidente Emilio Medici that year with Brabham). The team, initially known as Copersucar-Fittipaldi, did not have great success in their first racing season in 1975. Wilson was the sole driver and managed only six finishes, the highest of which was a 10th, and last, place at the US Grand Prix at Watkins Glen, and failed to qualify several times. Wilson stepped down from driving to look after the management of the team in 1976 when his brother, Emerson, joined the team from McLaren. His career total of three points, scored in 1972 and 1973 with Brabham, made him the most successful sibling of a Formula One World Champion until the arrival of Ralf Schumacher in 1997.

Wilson has occasionally returned to competitive driving. In the 1980s and early 1990s he drove in the Brazilian Stock Car championship, winning several rounds. In 1994 and 1995 he was victorious for Porsche in the classic Mil Milhas race founded by his father, on the former occasion sharing the car with his son Christian. In February 1998 he announced his return to competitive driving in the Brazilian Stock Car championship. In 2000 he was a guest driver for Mercedes-Benz at the Nürburgring round of the FIA European Truck Racing Cup, finishing 8th and 11th. In 2008, Wilson and Emerson entered the Brazilian GT3 Championship, driving a Porsche 997 GT3 for the WB Motorsports team.

Complete Formula One World Championship results
(key) (Races in bold indicate pole position)

Complete Non-Championship Formula One results
(key) (Races in bold indicate pole position)

Formula One records

 As Fittipaldi brothers
Before the Fittipaldis, three pairs of brothers had raced in Formula One: Jimmy and Jackie Stewart, Pedro and Ricardo Rodríguez, and Ernesto and Vittorio Brambilla. However,  none of the siblings had competed in the same race. The Fittipaldi brothers were the first to compete in the same race, and also the first to score points in the same race: Wilson Fittipaldi only scored points in two Formula One races, (the 1973 Argentine Grand Prix and 1973 German Grand Prix), but on both occasions his younger brother, Emerson, also scored points (a win in Argentina and 6th in Germany).

Since the Fittipaldis, another six sets of brothers have competed in Formula One. Ian and Jody Scheckter, Gilles and Jacques Villeneuve Sr., Manfred and Joachim Winkelhock, Teo and Corrado Fabi, and Gary and David Brabham all failed to score points in the same race. Michael and Ralf Schumacher were the next to do so at the 1997 French Grand Prix.

 As the father of a Formula One driver
They have since been followed by Graham and Damon Hill, Mario and Michael Andretti, Gilles and Jacques Villeneuve, Keke and Nico Rosberg, Satoru and Kazuki Nakajima, Nelson Piquet and Nelson Piquet Jr., Jan and Kevin Magnussen, Jos and Max Verstappen, Jonathan, Jolyon Palmer and Michael and Mick Schumacher.

Career in management and business

Although their father was reluctant to fund racing careers for them, the Fittipaldi brothers were able to finance their early racing careers by setting up a successful custom car accessory business while still in their teens, and then businesses building karts and Formula Vee cars. There was also a Fittipaldi-Porsche project - a one-off sports car chassis with Porsche mechanicals that the brothers built and raced in 1968.

In mid-1974 Wilson had persuaded Brazilian sugar and alcohol conglomerate Copersucar to sponsor his Formula One team, and from 1976 he had retired from driving and to concentrate on the management of the team, which ran with occasional flashes of success in Formula One from 1975 until it shut down in 1982.

Since then he has involved himself with the family's business interests, including a Mercedes-Benz dealership. He has also carried out some TV work, and been involved in the racing career of his son, Christian, managing him from 1996. In 2004 he became technical director of the WB motorsport team in Brazilian V8 stock cars. This led to the younger Fittipaldi testing one of the cars in 2004 before taking part in the championship in 2005 with a different team.

References

Footnotes

Sources
 Wilson Fittipaldi http://www.statsf1.com/drivers/fiche.asp?IdPilote=462&LG=1  Accessed 7 March 2006
 Hall of Fame – Emerson Fittipaldi http://www.formula1.com/teams_and_drivers/hall_of_fame/282/ Accessed 7 March 2006
 Fittipaldi Automotive, Wilson Fittipaldi http://www.grandprix.com/gpemain.html  Accessed 7 March 2006
 Mil Milhas results http://www.racingcircuits.net/Brazil/_gpMilMilhas.html  Accessed 7 March 2006
 Ricardo Divila http://www.teamdan.com/people/d.html  Accessed 7 March 2006
 Alfa win in SuperTouring category of 2006 Mil Milhas http://www.italiaspeed.com/2006/motorsport/sportscars/other/mil_milhas/2501_report.html Accessed 8 March 2006
 Wilson announces return to track http://www.theautochannel.com/news/date/19980223/news010199.html Accessed 9 March 2006
 Wilson Fittipaldi será o coordenador da WB http://www.speedonline.com.br/montatela.php?t=news_especiais1&sql_query=13018  Accessed 9 March 2006 (in Portuguese)
 https://web.archive.org/web/20060413230040/http://www.stockcar.com.br/mapa_site/mapa_site.asp

All racing and championship results come from:
 Formula One results for 1972–1976 seasons http://www.formula1.com/results/season/1972/ Accessed 7 March 2006
 Formula 2 Race Index 1971 http://www.formula2.net/F271_Index.htm Accessed 7 March 2006
 British & Irish F3 results 1970 http://www.formula2.net/F370_IndexGB.htm Accessed 7 March 2006

1943 births
Living people
Brazilian racing drivers
Brazilian Formula One drivers
Formula One team owners
Formula One team principals
Brabham Formula One drivers
Fittipaldi Formula One drivers
European Formula Two Championship drivers
British Formula Three Championship drivers
Stock Car Brasil drivers
Brazilian people of Italian descent
Brazilian people of Russian descent
Brazilian people of Polish descent
Racing drivers from São Paulo
World Sportscar Championship drivers
Wilson Fittipaldi Junior